The Mathias Baronetcy, of Vaendre Hall in St Mellons in the County of Monmouth, was a title in the Baronetage of the United Kingdom. It was created on 28 June 1917 for the Liberal politician Richard Mathias. He was a partner of J. Mathias & Sons, shipowners, of Cardiff, and represented Cheltenham in the House of Commons from 1910 to 1911. He was later a deputy lieutenant of Monmouthshire. The baronetcy became extinct on the death in 1991 of his son, the second baronet.

Mathias baronets, of Vaendre Hall (1917) 
 Sir Richard Mathias, 1st Baronet (1863–1942)
 Sir Richard Hughes Mathias, 2nd Baronet (1905–1991)

See also
Vaendre Hall

Notes

References
Kidd, Charles, Williamson, David (editors). Debrett's Peerage and Baronetage (1990 edition). New York: St Martin's Press, 1990, 

Extinct baronetcies in the Baronetage of the United Kingdom